Miriam Cani (born 30 May 1985) is an Albanian singer, songwriter and television host. She was a member of the successful German pop girl group Preluders. Beyond her music career, Cani has been featured as a judge on the Albanian television talent competition series The X Factor Albania, The Voice of Albania and The Voice Kids Albania.

Life and career

Popstars Germany 

In 2003, Miriam Cani along with 13 other participants auditioned for a spot in the German version of the talent show Popstars and in the end she was voted as one of the winners and became a member of the girl group Preluders. Cani made her first TV appearance in Germany in 1993 in the show "Interaktiv".
She participated in the musical "Hair" in Germany and also in the musical ''Ludwig 2" in 2013 in Germany ,and in the musical "Chicago" in Albania, where she played the main role, Roxie Hart. As a television host she hosted Jamba TV Clip Clash and Eclips in Germany, and Festivali i Këngës in Albania. She sang in the FilmHarmonic Night in Germany, and also performed her single Bring the Rain in Fernsehgarten.

She presented the Albanian national final for the Eurovision Song Contest 2010. Cani herself participated in the Albanian national final for the Eurovision Song Contest 2011 in Germany with the entry "Ende ka shpresë" in a duet with singer Alban Skënderaj, now her husband.

Personal life 

After a music collaboration proposed by her father, Cani started a relationship with  Albanian singer Alban Skënderaj in 2007. On 28 November 2015, Cani gave birth to a daughter, Ameli Skënderaj, on the occasion of Albania's 103rd independence day. In June 2019, Skënderaj presented a concert as part of his Hapësira e një ëndrre event in Pristina, Kosovo, at which both Skënderaj and Cani performed "Dhurata" and started the performance by revealing she was pregnant. Their son named Duam Skënderaj was born on 14 January 2020.

Discography 

 2005: Shko
 2005: Belong
 2006: One Goal
 2006: Don't Surrender (feat. Alketa Vejsiu)
 2007: When a Devil Loves an Angel
 2009: Let Me Die With You (feat. Alban Skënderaj)
 2010: Mos më ndal
 2010: Ende ka shpresë (feat. Alban Skënderaj)
 2011: Somebody Hurts (feat. Alban Skënderaj)
 2012: Përgjithmonë
 2013: Ti s'e di përse
 2013: I paprekshëm
 2013: Labirint
 2014: Shiu im
 2014: Bring the Rain
 2017: Meteor
 2017: Dhurata (feat. Alban Skënderaj)
 2017: More Than a Song (feat. Alban Skënderaj)
 2018: Radio Silence
 2018: Në parajsë
 2019: Duamë (feat. Alban Skënderaj)

References 

1985 births
Living people
People from Elbasan
Musicians from Heidelberg
21st-century Albanian women singers
German people of Albanian descent
Popstars winners
German television presenters
Albanian television personalities
Albanian women television presenters